Disomus is the fourth studio album by American deathcore band Through the Eyes of the Dead. The album was released on October 13, 2017 via Entertainment One Music/Good Fight Music.

Critical reception

Nicholas Senior of New Noise Magazine calls the album "a notable step up for the East Coast collective" in "how they’ve doubled down on the menace and brutality while expanding their sonic palate in all the right ways".

James Weaver of Distorted Sound Magazine states that "Intertwining riffing that ooze technicality from guitarists Steven Funderburk and Justin Longshore demonstrates the band’s skill whilst the combination of Michael Ranne‘s blasts from the drums and Danny Rodriguez‘s thunderous vocals pack a powerful punch".

Track listing
 Hate The Living - 4:19
 Obitual - 4:03 (feat. Anthony Gunnells)
 Haruspex - 3:25
 Of Mortals, We Once Were - 3:37
 The Binding Nightmare Hex - 4:43
 Vortices In The Stygian Maelstrom - 4:02 (feat. John Robert C. of The Last Ten Seconds of Life, ex-My Bitter End, ex-Painted in Exile, ex-Ender)
 Ignis - 1:39
 Teras - 4:29 (feat. Nate Johnson of ex-Fit for an Autopsy, ex-Deadwater Drowning)
 Till Solace, She'll Haunt - 4:17
 Dismal - 4:34

References

2017 albums
Through the Eyes of the Dead albums
MNRK Music Group albums